The Scheldt campaigns  of 1339–1340 were a series of manoeuvres by opposing French and Flemish forces during the Hundred Years' War.

Background
Following a series of disagreements between Philip VI of France and Edward III of England regarding the status of English-held lands in south-west France, on 24 May 1337 Philip's Great Council in Paris declared that they were forfeit. This marked the start of the Hundred Years' War, which was to last 116 years. Edward attempted to assemble an alliance of nobles and small states to the north and east of France, including Flanders, which at the time was a province of France. Many of Edward's would-be allies had acknowledged Philip as their liege lord and were reluctant to renege on this. To overcome this, on 26 January 1340 Edward revived a claim to the French throne and had himself crowned king of France.

Campaign 
The French assembled an army, which based itself in the city of Cambrai, on the Scheldt. Several Flemish forces, supplemented by some English troops and leaders, manoeuvred against the French city of Tournai, with little success.

Citations and sources

Citations

Sources

 
 
 
 

1330s in France
1340s in France
Military history of the Pas-de-Calais
Conflicts in 1339
Conflicts in 1340
Edward III of England
1339 in England
1340 in England
Hundred Years' War, 1337–1360
Military campaigns involving France